(historically known in English as the Gaelic League) is a social and cultural organisation which promotes the Irish language in Ireland and worldwide. The organisation was founded in 1893 with Douglas Hyde as its first president, when it emerged as the successor of several 19th century groups such as the Gaelic Union. The organisation was a spearhead of the Gaelic revival and of Gaeilgeoir activism. 

While Hyde succeeded in drawing unionists to the League, the organisation increasingly gave expression to the nationalist impulse behind the language revival. From 1915, members of its executive acknowledged the leadership of the Irish Republican Brotherhood in the struggle for Irish statehood. After the creation of the Irish Free State, and limited advances with respect to the teaching and official use of the language, many members transferred their commitment to the new institutions, political parties and education system. 

In 2008, Conradh na Gaeilge adopted a new constitution, dropping the post-1915 references to "Irish freedom", while reaffirming the ambition to restore Irish as the language of everyday life throughout Ireland. In Northern Ireland, it campaigned for an Irish Language Act/Acht na Gaeilge. In the absence of an agreed Stormont executive, in 2022 the Westminster Parliament incorporated many of its proposed provisions in the Identity and Language (Northern Ireland) Act.

Foundation: 'De-Anglicising Ireland" 

Conradh na Gaeilge, the Gaelic League, was formed in 1893 at a time Irish as a spoken language appeared to be on the verge of extinction. Analysis of the 1881 Census showed that at least 45% of those born in Ireland in the first decade of the 19th century had been brought up as Irish speakers. Figures from the 1891 census suggested that just 3.5% were being raised speaking the language. Ireland had become an overwhelmingly English-speaking country. Spoken mainly by peasants and farm labourers in the poorer districts of the west of Ireland, Irish was widely seen, in the words of Matthew Arnold, as "the badge of a beaten race."

The first aim of the League was to maintain the language in the Gaeltacht, the largely western districts in which spoken Irish survived. The late 20th-century Gaeilgeoir activist Aodán Mac Póilin notes, however, that "the main ideological impact of the language movement was not in the Gaeltacht, but among English-speaking nationalists". The League developed "both a conservationist and a revivalist role".

The League's first president Douglas Hyde (Dúbhghlás de hÍde), the son of a Church of Ireland rector from Roscommon, helped create an ethos in the early days that attracted a number of unionists into its ranks. Remarkably, these included the Rev. Richard Kane, Grand Master of the Belfast Orange Lodge and organiser of the Anti-Home Rule Convention of 1892. But from the beginning there was an unresolved conflict between non-political rhetoric and the nationalism implicit in the League's revivalist project.

With the aid of Eugene O'Growney (author Simple Lessons in Irish) Eoin MacNeill, Thomas O'Neill Russell and others, the League was launched in the wake of an address Hyde delivered to the Irish National Literary Society, on 25 November 1892: ‘"The Necessity for De-Anglicising Ireland’". Citing Giuseppe Mazzini (the Italian nationalist who had been the inspiration for the rare language enthusiast among the Young Irelanders, Thomas Davis), Hyde argued that "in Anglicising ourselves wholesale we have thrown away with a light heart the best claim we have to nationality".

The organisation developed from Ulick Bourke's earlier Gaelic Union and became the leading institution promoting the Gaelic Revival, organising Irish classes and student immersions in the Gaeltacht, and publishing in Irish. The League's first newspaper was An Claidheamh Soluis (The Sword of Light) and its most noted editor was Pádraig Pearse. The motto of the League was Sinn Féin, Sinn Féin amháin (Ourselves, Ourselves alone).

Early campaigns 
Among the League's few campaign successes in its first decade was acceptance by the Post Office of parcels and letters addressed in Irish, and the recognition of St. Patrick's Day as a national holiday.

With national feeling heightened in part by the Boer War, membership increased from 1900. The number of branches rose from 43 in 1897 to 600 in 1904 with a membership of 50,000. A more substantial victory followed: in 1904 Irish was introduced into the national school curriculum.

The Catholic church, however, was not an early ally. The clergy had played a significant role in the decline of the language. In the National schools they had punished children for speaking it (a legacy, in part, of the Irish-language missionary activity of the Protestant churches).

The national cause 
Hyde declared that "The Irish language, thank God, is neither Protestant nor Catholic, it is neither a Unionist nor a Separatist." Although the League took this non-political principle seriously enough to decline participation in the unveiling of a 1798 centenary monument to Wolfe Tone, much like the Gaelic Athletic Association the organisation served as an occasion and cover for nationalist recruitment. Seán T. O'Kelly recalls that, as early 1903, as a travelling manager for An Claidheamh Soluis, he was in a position to recruit young men for Irish Republican Brotherhood (IRB) in every one of 32 counties. It was through the League that many future leaders of the independence struggle first met, laying the foundation for groups such as the Irish Volunteers (1913).

"While being non-political", Michael Collins saw the League, by "its very nature", as "intensely national". Under a system of foreign rule that made the people "forget to look to themselves, and to turn their backs upon their own country", it did "more than any other movement to restore national pride, honour and self-respect". Arthur Griffith had been similarly dismissive of the League's political neutrality of the League. Popular support for the revival of the language, he argued, sprang precisely from its role as a mark of Irish nationality.

As the nationalist impulse behind the League became more obvious, and in particular as the League began to work more closely with the Catholic Church to secure support for teaching Irish in the schools, Unionists withdrew. Hyde's effort to leave space for unionists was lost. They were themselves moving toward  a distinct Ulster unionism which rejected any form of Irish cultural identity.
Increasingly Republicans were blunt about what they saw as the League's place within the nationalist movement. The paper, Irish Freedom, declared:The work of the Gaelic League is to prevent the assimilation of the Irish nation by the English nation [...] The work is as essentially anti-English as the work attempted by Fenianism or the Society of United Irishmen [...] The Irish language is a political weapon of the first importance against English encroachment.The issue of the League's political independence was decided at its Annual General Meeting held in Dundalk in 1915. Rumours circulated that John Redmond's Irish Parliamentary Party were seeking to take over the League as they had earlier attempted to take over the Irish Volunteers. Diarmuid Lynch of the IRB mobilised Brotherhood members positioned throughout the League to secure the nominations and votes required to appoint a new Coiste (executive) that "was safe from the IRB viewpoint".

Northern Protestants 
The first Ulster branch of the Gaelic League was formed in east Belfast in 1895, a year after the death of Robert Shipboy MacAdam who, with Dr. James MacDonnell, had presided over a precursor of the League earlier in the century: Cuideacht Gaoidhilge Uladh / The Ulster Gaelic Society (1828-1843). The new Belfast branch was formed under the active patronage (until he left to become Church of Ireland Lord Bishop of Ossory) of the Rev. John Baptiste Crozier and the presidency of his parishioner, Dr. John St Clair Boyd, both unionists, and of the Orange Order Grand Master, the Rev. Richard Tutledge Kane. For other Protestant pioneers of the Irish language in the north the League was a non-sectarian door into the nationalist community with whom their political sympathies lay.

This was the case for Alice Milligan, publisher in Belfast of The Shan Van Vocht.  Milligan's command of Irish was never fluent, and on that basis Patrick Pearse was to object when, in 1904, the Gaelic League hired her as a travelling lecturer. She proved herself by establishing new branches throughout Ireland and raising funds along the way. In the north, in Ulster, she focused on the more difficult task of recruiting Protestants, working with, among other activists, Hyde, Ada McNeill, Roger Casement, Alice Stopford Green, Stephen Gwynn, and Seamus McManus.

James Owen Hannay (better known as the novelist George A. Birmingham), originally of Belfast, was co-opted onto the League's national executive body in December 1904 while a Church of Ireland (Anglican) rector in Westport in County Mayo. Hyde and Arthur Griffith sympathised with Hannay's desire for a "union of the two Irish democracies", Catholic in the south and Protestant in the north. In the north Hannay saw a potential ally in Lindsay Crawford and his Independent Orange Order. Like the Conradh na Gaeilge, he saw the IOO as "profoundly democratic in spirit" and independent of "the rich and the patronage of the great".

Crawford, who stood for election to the League's executive committee, was critical of what he regarded as the League's impractical romanticism. In his paper, Irish Protestant, he suggested that the Irish Ireland movement needed an injection of "Ulsteria", an "industrial awakening on true economic lines: it is wrong when people crave bread to offer them 'language and culture'".

Offence taken at his successful play General John Regan, and his defence of Crawford's opposition to church control of education, strained Hannay's relations with nationalists and he withdrew from League. Meanwhile, in North America, Crawford (who had found no political home in Ireland) went on to campaign with Eamon de Valera for recognition and support for the republic proclaimed in 1916.

Ernest Blythe, who joined the Irish Republican Brotherhood in 1909 with the distinction of maintaining for three years his membership of the Orange Order,  had as his first Conradh na Gaeilge teacher  Sinéad Flanagan, de Valera's future wife. To improve his knowledge of the Irish language, he lived in the County Kerry Gaeltacht earning his keep as an agricultural labourer. A similar path was followed by IRB organiser of the Irish Volunteers, Bulmer Hobson.

Participation of women 
Alice Milligan was exceptional among the League's leading activists as a northern Protestant, but less so as a woman. All the priorities of the larger Irish-Ireland movement which developed around the revival of the language, including teaching children a national history and literature, and the use and consumption of Irish-made products, were associated with the sphere of home and community in which women were accorded initiative. In comparison to the political parties (whether republican or constitutionalist), organisations, like the League, promoting a cultural agenda were comparatively open and receptive to women.

The League encouraged female participation from the start and women filled prominent roles. Local notables, such as Lady Gregory in Galway, Lady Esmonde in County Wexford, and Mary Spring Rice in County Limerick, and others such as Máire Ní Shúilleabháin and Norma Borthwick, founded and led branches. In positions of trust, however, women did remain a decided minority. At the annual national convention in 1906 women were elected to seven of the forty-five positions on the Gaelic League executive. Executive members included Máire Ní Chinnéide, Úna Ní Fhaircheallaigh (who wrote pamphlets on behalf of the League), Bean an Doc Uí Choisdealbha, Máire Ní hAodáin, Máire de Builtéir, Nellie O'Brien, Eibhlín Ní Dhonnabháin, and Eibhlín Nic Niocaill.

Máire de Builtéir (Mary E. L. Butler who is credited with suggesting to Arthur Griffith the term Sinn Féin ) made it clear that women could make their contribution to the cultural revival without relinquishing their traditional roles. "Let it be thoroughly understood", she insisted, "that when Irish women are invited to take part in the language movement, they are not required to plunge into the vortex of public life. No the work they can best do is work to be done in the home. There mission is to make the homes of Ireland Irish".

Criticism 
Formed in the wake of the disgrace and fall of the nationalist leader Charles Stewart Parnell and defeat of the second Home Rule Bill, the League drew upon a generation frustrated and disillusioned with electoral politics. But proponents of new and rival movements were sceptical of the cultural activism offered by the League.

Writing in Alice Milligan's Belfast monthly, labour and socialist leader James Connolly maintained that in the absence of a creed capable of challenging the rule of the capitalist, landlord and financier, the nationalism of the Irish language movement would achieve little. His friend and collaborator Frederick Ryan, secretary of the Irish National Theatre Society, acknowledged the "pathos" in that in "young men and women rushing to acquire the rudiments of Irish (and it seldom gets beyond that) in order to show that they are not as other nations", but suggested that it did not "correlate with the active desire for political freedom". Most leaders of the Gaelic League desired "a return to medievalism in thought, in literature, in pastimes, in music and even in dress", but a nation, he argued, is not morally raised by dwelling on its past. Rather it must deal with its present political, economic, and social problems, something of which Ireland is capable without assuming "the enormous burden of adopting what is now virtually a new language".

Patrick Pearse, who had joined the League while in his teens, responded in An Claidheamh Soluis by defending a "critical traditionalism". The cultural self-belief promoted by the League does not call for "folk attitudes of mind" or "folk conventions of form".  Irish artists might have to "imbibe their Irishness from the peasant, since the peasants alone possess Irishism, but they need not and must not [...] be afraid of modern culture".  Deriving "what is best in medieval Irish literature", the new Irish prose would be characterised by a "terseness", "crispness", and "plain straightforwardness" entirely conducive to the demands of the modern nation-state and economy.

In the Irish Free State 
With the foundation of the Irish Free State many members believed that the Gaelic League had taken language revival as far as it could and that the task now fell to the new Irish Government. They ceased their League activities and were absorbed into the new political parties and into state bodies such as the Army, Police, Civil Service, and into the school system in which Irish was made compulsory. With the organisation paying a less prominent role in public life, It fared badly in the 1925 Irish Seanad election. All its endorsed candidates, including Hyde, were rejected.

From 1926 there was growing disquiet among League members over the government's failure to implement the recommendations of its own Gaeltacht Commission. Despite being presided over by Blythe, one of their own, the Ministry of Finance baulked at the proposal for free secondary school education for Gaeltacht children (something that was not available anywhere in Ireland until the 1960s). The League was also alarmed by the Anglicising and cosmopolitan influences of state radio (great objection was made to its programming of Jazz). The failure of the Cumann na nGaedheal government to commit to a more comprehensive programme for defending and promoting Irish and what was perceived, typically in conservative folk terms, as its supporting culture, helped rally support for de Valera's anti-Treaty republican party Fianna Fail. Partly in recognition of his services in the League services, under de Valera's new constitution, Hyde served as the first President of Ireland from June 1938 to June 1945.

In 1927, An Coimisiún Le Rincí Gaelacha (CLRG) was founded as a subcommittee of the League to investigate the promotion of traditional Irish dance. Eventually, CLRG became a largely independent organisation, though it is required by its constitution to share 3 board members with the League.

Contemporary campaigns for language rights 
Conradh na Gaeilge, in alliance with other groups such as Gluaiseacht Chearta Sibhialta na Gaeltachta, was instrumental in the community campaigns which led to the creation of RTÉ Raidió na Gaeltachta (1972), Údarás na Gaeltachta (1980), and TG4 (1996). The organisation successfully campaigned for the enactment of the Official Languages Act, 2003 which gave greater statutory protection to Irish speakers and created the position of An Coimisinéir Teanga (The Languages Commissioner). Conradh na Gaeilge was among the principal organisations responsible for co-ordinating the successful campaign to make Irish an official language of the European Union.

In 2008 during the presidency of Dáithí Mac Cárthaigh, Conradh na Gaeilge adopted a new constitution reverting to its pre 1915 non-political stance restating its aim as that of an Irish-speaking Ireland "Is í aidhm na hEagraíochta an Ghaeilge a athréimniú mar ghnáththeanga na hÉireann" ("It is the aim of the Organization to reinstate the Irish language as the everyday language of Ireland") and dropping any reference to Irish freedom.

In recent years Conradh na Gaeilge has remained central to campaigns to protect language rights throughout Ireland. This strategy encompasses the promotion of increased investment in Gaeltacht areas, advocacy for increased provision of state services through Irish, the development of Irish language hubs in urban areas, and the Acht Anois campaign for the enactment of an Irish Language Act to protect the language in Northern Ireland.

The decision of the Democratic Unionist Party to resist a stand-alone Irish Language Act, in part by insisting on compensating provisions for Ulster Scots, became one of the principal, publicly acknowledged, sticking points in the three years of on and off again negotiations required to restore the power-sharing executive in 2020. The 2020 New Decade New Approach agreement promised both the Irish language and Ulster-Scots new Commissioners to "support" and "enhance" their development but does not accord them equal legal status. While Ulster Scots was to be recognised as a regional or minority language for the "encouragement" and "facilitation" purposes of Part II of the European Charter for Regional or Minority Languages, provision for Irish was to meet the more stringent Part III obligations in respect of education, media and administration. 

In 2022, with unionist protest against the Northern Ireland Protocol having resulted in a further suspension of devolved government, the United Kingdom Parliament incorporated the language provisions of New Decade New Approach in the Identity and Language (Northern Ireland) Act. The president of the Conradh na Gaeilge, Paula Melvin, hailed the passing of the legislation, but said the bill was "not our final destination". The organisation would turn its attention to both implementing and to strengthening the legislation: "painful experience with the British government has taught us to take nothing for granted".

Branches
Conradh na Gaeilge has a number of branches across Ireland and internationally which organise locally, and are governed by committee.

Ulster (including County Louth) 

County Antrim, 19 branches
County Armagh, 4 branches
County Cavan, 1 branch
County Down, 8 branches
County Donegal, 3 branches
County Fermanagh 1 branch
County Londonderry, 4 branches
County Monaghan, 2 branches
County Tyrone, 13 branches
County Louth, 2 branches

Leinster (excluding County Louth)

County Dublin, 21 branches
County Carlow, 1 branch
County Kilkenny, 1 branch
County Kildare, 4 branches
County Meath, 2 branches
County Wexford, 2 branches

Munster

County Clare, 5 branches
County Cork, 12 branches
County Kerry, 10 branches
County Limerick, 6 branches
County Tipperary, 6 branches
County Waterford, 2 branches

Connacht

County Galway, 17 branches
County Leitrim, 1 branch
County Mayo, 9 branches
County Roscommon, 1 branch
County Sligo, 1 branch

Britain

Glasgow, 1 branch
Liverpool, 1 branch
London, 1 branch

Presidents

 1893–1915, Douglas Hyde
 1916–1919, Eoin Mac Néill
 1919–1922, Seán Ua Ceallaigh
 1922–1925, Peadar Mac Fhionnlaoich
 1925–1926, Seán P. Mac Énrí 
 1926-1928, Cormac Breathnach
 1928–1933, Mac Giolla Bhríde
 1933–1940, Peadar Mac Fhionnlaoich
 1940–1941, Liam Ó Buachalla
 1941–1942, Seán Óg Ó Tuama
 1942–1945, Diarmuid Mac Fhionnlaoich
 1945–1946, Seán Mac Gearailt
 1946–1949, Liam Ó Luanaigh
 1949–1950, Diarmuid Mac Fhionnlaoich
 1950–1952, Annraoi Ó Liatháin
 1952–1955, Seán Mac Gearailt
 1955–1959, Tomás Ó Muircheartaigh
 1959–1965, Micheál Mac Cárthaigh
 1965–1968, Cathal Ó Feinneadha
 1968–1974, Maolsheachlainn Ó Caollaí
 1974–1979, Pádraig Ó Snodaigh
 1979–1982, Albert Fry
 1982–1985, Micheál Ó Murchú
 1985–1989, Íte Ní Chionnaith
 1989–1994, Proinsias Mac Aonghusa
 1994–1995, Áine de Baróid
 1995-1998, Gearóid Ó Cairealláin
 1998–2003, Tomás Mac Ruairí
 2003–2004, Séagh Mac Siúrdáin
 2004–2005, Nollaig Ó Gadhra
 2005–2008, Dáithí Mac Cárthaigh
 2008–2011, Pádraig Mac Fhearghusa
 2011–2014, Donnchadh Ó hAodha
 2014–2017, Cóilín Ó Cearbhaill
 2017–2022, Niall Comer
 2022–present, Paula Melvin

See also
 Foras na Gaeilge
 An Comunn Gàidhealach
 Yn Çheshaght Ghailckagh

References

Bibliography

External links

 

 
1893 establishments in Ireland
Educational organisations based in Ireland
Seanad nominating bodies